Parmotrema applanatum is a species of saxicolous lichen in the family Parmeliaceae. Originally described from collections made in Vale do Sol, Brazil, it was introduced as new to science in 2002. In 2005, the lichen was recorded in China. It grows on tree-shaded rocks in open woods. The species is difficult to collect because the thallus adheres strongly to its substrate. The specific epithet appalantum (Latin for "plane") refers to "the notoriously plane habit of the thalli". Parmotrema applanatum resembles P.  hababianum, but differs from that species in lacking cilia, and containing traces of usnic acid and atranorin in its upper cortex.

See also
List of Parmotrema species

References

applanatum
Lichen species
Lichens described in 2002
Lichens of China
Lichens of Brazil